The 1927 Oklahoma A&M Cowboys football team represented Oklahoma A&M College—now kownn as Oklahoma State University–Stillwater—as a member of the Missouri Valley Conference during the 1927 college football season. Led by seventh-year head coach John Maulbetsch, the Cowboys compiled an overall record of 4–4 with a mark of 2–1 in conference play, placing third in the MVC. Oklahoma A&M played home games at Lewis Field in Stillwater, Oklahoma.

Schedule

References

Oklahoma AandM
Oklahoma State Cowboys football seasons
Oklahoma AandM